Bibha Gosh Goswami represented Nabadwip, West Bengal (a constituency reserved for scheduled castes) in the 5th, 6th, 7th, and 8th Lok Sabha. She is a member of the Communist Party of India (Marxist).

Early life and education 
Bibha Gosh was on born on 12 January 1934, in Hidia Village, East Bengal (now Bangladesh) to parents Banamali Goswami and Smt. Sudhamani. She is a member of a scheduled caste. She attended M.S.T.P. Girls High School in Jessore and Brahmo Balika Shikshalaya in Calcutta. She went to college at Lady Brabourne (Calcutta, Krishnagar Government College, and University Teachers Training Institute (Calcutta).

Career

Lok Sabha 
Bibha Gosh Goswami served in the fifth Lok Sabha from 1971–77, the sixth Lok Sabha from 1977-1979, the seventh Lok Sabha from 1980-1984 and the eighth Lok Sabha. During her time in the Lok Subha, she was also on the Consultative Committee on Ministry of Education, Social Welfare and Culture from 1977-1984 and on the Joint Committee on Hindu Marriage Act (Amendment) in 1981.

In 1983 she introduced Bill 81 which was to provide for equal pay for women and men, which was promised by the constitution but Bibha Gosh stated that it was not followed through. The bill was passed.

In 1985 Bibha introduced Bill 37 to provide for the Welfare of Women employed in industries to provide them with resources. The Bill lapsed.

She was also involved in the Commission on Sati Prevention Act. 1987. Where most of her focus was on reframing the idea that Sati could be voluntary.

Associations and Offices 
She is the president of the West Bengal Democratic Women's Association, Nadia District since 1972. She served as the Vice-President from 1974-79. She has also been on the executive committee of All India Democratic Women's Association since 1981. Bibha Ghosh Goswami has held various offices in the All Bengal Teachers' Association since 1960 and was on the West Bengal State Welfare Advisory Committee from 1977-1982.

Personal life 
Her hobbies include education and history and she particularly enjoys the music of Ravindra Sangeet.

References

1934 births
Living people
Women members of the Lok Sabha
Communist Party of India (Marxist) politicians from West Bengal
India MPs 1971–1977
India MPs 1977–1979
India MPs 1980–1984
India MPs 1984–1989
Lok Sabha members from West Bengal
People from Nadia district
20th-century Indian women
20th-century Indian people